Villaviciosa de Córdoba is a Spanish geographical indication for Vino de la Tierra wines located in the municipalities of Villaviciosa de Córdoba and Espiel, in the province of Córdoba, Andalusia, Spain, which acquired its legal status in 2008.

Grape varieties
The following grape varieties are authorized by the DO's regulations:
 Baladí Verdejo
 Moscatel de Alejandría
 Palomino Fino
 Palomino
 Pedro Ximénez
 Airén
 Calagraño
 Jaén
 Torrontés
 Verdejo

The maximum authorized yield is 10,000 kg/hectare.

Wines
The following types of wines are covered by this DO:
 White: Minimum alcohol content 13° for oak-aged wines, and 10° for young wines
 Sweet: Minimum alcohol content 13°

See also
 Vino de la Tierra

References

Wine regions of Spain